5 Paoni - Coptic calendar - 7 Paoni

Fixed commemorations
All fixed commemorations below are observed on 6 Paoni (13 June) by the Coptic Orthodox Church.

Saints
Saint Theodorus the Confessor

References
Coptic Synexarion

Days of the Coptic calendar